K. J. Hippensteel and David Martin were the defending champions, but only Martin competed this year with his brother Timothy. They were eliminated in the second round by Mario Ančić and Steve Berke.

Frenchmen Julien Benneteau and Nicolas Mahut won the title, defeating home team Tres Davis and Alberto Francis in the final, 6–4, 3–6, 6–1.

Seeds

Draw

Finals

Top half

Bottom half

References
Main Draw

Boys' Doubles
US Open, 1999 Boys' Doubles